La Feuillie is a commune in the Seine-Maritime department in the Normandy region in north-western France.

Geography

Population

Places of interest
 The ruins of a feudal castle.
 The church of St. Eustache, dating from the sixteenth century.

See also
Communes of the Seine-Maritime department

References

Communes of Seine-Maritime